Psallus haematodes is a true bug. The species is found in the Palearctic.It occurs almost everywhere in Europe, but only occurs in the north of the Mediterranean. East the range extends to Siberia and to the Caspian region. It is introduced  in North America.  It is found in open, sunny, but also shady places on wetland edges, rivers and in bogs, and also in dry habitats.

Psallus haematodes feeds on willow (Salix), Salix caprea, Salix aurita Salix cinerea, 
Salix repens and Salix viminalis. Adults are found in late summer.

References

External links
British Bugs

Hemiptera of Europe
Phylini
Insects described in 1790
Taxa named by Johann Friedrich Gmelin